Basic Channel is a German music duo and record label, composed of Moritz von Oswald and Mark Ernestus, that originated in Berlin in 1993. The duo have also worked under other names, including Rhythm & Sound and Maurizio, and have founded offshoot label imprints such as Chain Reaction and Main Street. Their work in the 1990s is regarded as pioneering the minimal and dub techno subgenres.

History
Basic Channel was founded by Moritz von Oswald and Mark Ernestus in 1993 in Berlin, Germany. At the time, von Oswald was working as an in-house producer for the Berlin label Tresor. The project grew around Hard Wax, the record store opened by Ernestus in 1989. In order to achieve preferred mastering quality, the duo founded their own mastering house Dubplates & Mastering. 

Between 1993 and 1994, the record label released the duo's nine 12-inch vinyl singles, which featured minimal information and cryptic lettering, leaving the nature of the project obscure. Their minimalist sound and incorporation of delay effects inspired by dub reggae helped to define the nascent dub techno scene. The Quietus credited these releases with "spawning a legion of imitators and earning the duo legend status among those in the know." Basic Channel has since released two compilation CDs which collect edits of their 12-inch releases: BCD (1995) and BCD-2 (2008).

Moritz von Oswald and Mark Ernestus have founded numerous record labels such as Chain Reaction, Main Street Records, and Rhythm & Sound. The duo's collaborative works have also been released under the monikers Maurizio and Rhythm & Sound. As Rhythm & Sound, the duo have recorded more faithful takes on Jamaican dub in collaboration with vocalists such as Paul St. Hilaire, Cornell Campbell and the Love Joys.

Discography

Basic Channel
Albums
 Basic Channel – BCD (1995, BCD, CD)
 Basic Channel – BCD-2 (2008, BCD-2, CD)

Singles
 Cyrus – "Enforcement" (1993, BC-01, 12")
 Basic Channel – "Phylyps Trak" (1993, BC-02, 12")
 Vainqueur – "Lyot RMX" (1993, BC-03, 12")
 Quadrant – "Q1.1" (1993, BC-04, 12")
 Cyrus – "Inversion" (1994, BC-05, 12")
 Basic Channel – "Quadrant Dub" (1994, BC-06, 12")
 Basic Channel – "Octagon" (1994, BC-07, 12")
 Basic Channel – "Radiance" (1994, BC-08, 12")
 Basic Channel – "Phylyps Trak II" (1994, BC-09, 12")
 Basic Channel – "Remake (Basic Reshape)" (2004, BC-BR, 12")
 Quadrant – "Infinition" (2004, BC-QD, 12")
 Basic Channel – "Q-Loop" (2014, BC-CD, 12")

Burial Mix
Albums
 Rhythm & Sound w/ Paul St. Hilaire – Showcase (1998, BMD-1, CD)
 Rhythm & Sound w/ the Artists – Rhythm & Sound w/ the Artists (2003, BMD-2, CD)
 Rhythm & Sound – The Versions (2003, BMD-3, CD)
 Rhythm & Sound w/ the Artists – Rhythm & Sound w/ the Artists (2004, BMLP-2, LP)
 Rhythm & Sound – The Versions (2004, BMLP-3, LP)
 Rhythm & Sound – See Mi Ya (2005, BMD-4, CD)
 Rhythm & Sound – See Mi Ya (2005, BMLP-4, LP)
 Rhythm & Sound – See Mi Ya (2005, BM-14-20, 7" box set)
 Rhythm & Sound – See Mi Ya Remixes (2006, BMXD-1, CD)

Singles
 Rhythm & Sound w/ Paul St. Hilaire – "Never Tell You" (1996, BM-01, 10")
 Rhythm & Sound w/ Paul St. Hilaire – "Spend Some Time" (1996, BM-02, 10")
 Rhythm & Sound w/ Paul St. Hilaire – "Ruff Way" (1997, BM-03, 10")
 Rhythm & Sound w/ Paul St. Hilaire – "What a Mistry" (1997, BM-04, 10")
 Rhythm & Sound w/ Paul St. Hilaire – "Why" (1997, BM-05, 10")
 Rhythm & Sound w/ Cornel Campbell – "King in My Empire" (2001, BM-06, 10")
 Rhythm & Sound w/ Paul St. Hilaire – "Jah Rule" (2001, BM-07, 10")
 Rhythm & Sound w/ Shalom – "We Been Troddin" (2001, BM-08, 10")
 Rhythm & Sound w/ the Chosen Brothers – "Making History" (2002, BM-09, 10")
 Rhythm & Sound w/ Love Joy – "Best Friend" (2002, BM-10, 10")
 Rhythm & Sound w/ Jennifer Lara – "Queen in My Empire" (2003, BM-11, 10")
 Rhythm & Sound w/ the Chosen Brothers – "Mash Down Babylon" (2003, BM-12, 10")
 Rhythm & Sound w/ Jah Batta – "Music Hit You" (2003, BM-13, 10")

Rhythm & Sound

Albums
 Rhythm & Sound – Rhythm & Sound (2001, RSD-1, CD)

Singles
 Rhythm & Sound w/ Tikiman – "Music A Fe Rule" (1997, RS-01, 12")
 Chosen Brothers / Rhythm & Sound – "Mango Walk" / "Mango Drive" (1998, RS-02, 12")
 Rhythm & Sound – "Roll Off" (1998, RS-03, 12")
 Rhythm & Sound w/ Savage – "Smile" (1999, RS-04, 12")
 Rhythm & Sound – "Carrier" (1999, RS-05, 12")
 Rhythm & Sound – "Trace" / "Imprint" (2001, RS-06, 12")
 Rhythm & Sound – "Aground" / "Aerial" (2002, RS-07, 12")

M-Series
Albums
 Maurizio – M-Series (1997, MCD, CD)

Singles
 Maurizio – "Ploy" (1992, M-1, 12")
 Vainquer – "Lyot" (1992, M-2, 12")
 Maurizio – "Domina" (1993, M-3, 12")
 Maurizio – "M-4" (1995, M-4, 12")
 Maurizio – "M-4.5" (1995, M-4.5, 12")
 Maurizio – "M-5" (1995, M-5, 12")
 Maurizio – "M-6" (1996, M-6, 12")
 Maurizio – "M-7" (1997, M-7, 12")

Main Street
Albums
 Round One to Round Five – 1993-99 (1999, MSD-01, CD)

Singles
 Round One – "I'm Your Brother" (1994, MSR-02, 12")
 Round Two – "New Day (1995, MSR-04, 12")
 Round Three w/ Paul St. Hilaire – "Acting Crazy" (1995, MSR-06, 12")
 Round Four w/ Paul St. Hilaire – "Find a Way" (1998, MSR-08, 12")
 Round Five w/ Paul St. Hilaire – "Na Fe Throw It" (1999, MSR-10, 12")

Related releases
Albums
 Scion – Arrange and Process Basic Channel Tracks (2002, Tresor, Tresor 200, CD)

References

Further reading

External links

 
 
 
 

German electronic music groups
German musical duos
Record production duos
German record labels
Electronic music record labels